Tasovčići is a village in Bosnia and Herzegovina. According to the 1991 census, the village is located in the municipality of Čapljina.

History
In the Roman period, there was a settlement called Latin: Ad Turres here. Originally belonging to the Manii tribe, it was on the road from Narona (modern Vid, Croatia) to Diluntum (modern Stolac, Bosnia and Hercegovina).

Demographics 
According to the 2013 census, its population was 1,950.

References

External links
Hazlitt's Classical Gazetteer
Čapljina portal umrli
Geographic Names Information System, for coordinates

Roman towns and cities in Bosnia and Herzegovina
Villages in the Federation of Bosnia and Herzegovina
Populated places in Čapljina